Metalmen, metal man, or, variant, may refer to:

 Robot (metal man), an archaic term for an anthropomorphic robotic device
 Android (metal man), an archaic term for an android
 Mannequin made from metal
 Statue that is anthropomorphic and made of metal

Fictional characters
 MetalMan (Rockman EXE), a videogame character from Rockman EXE 4.5 Real Operation
 Metalman (Boom! Studios), a comic book character from the comic Irredeemable
 Metal Men (DC Comics) a comic book superhero team and comics title

Music
 Dean Metalman (guitars), a line of guitars from Dean Guitars
 Dean Metalman ML, a bass guitar
 Dean Metalman Z, a bass guitar
 MetalMan (song), a 2008 song by The Megas (band)
 Metal Man (Marvin song), a Hitch Hiker's Guide to the Galaxy song concerning Marvin the Paranoid Android

Other uses
 Metalman Brewing (company), a craft brewery from Ireland, see Beer in Ireland
 Metalman (TV episode), a 2008 television episode of Oggy and the Cockroaches, see List of Oggy and the Cockroaches episodes
 Metal music person

See also

 
 
 
 
 Metal (disambiguation)
 Men (disambiguation)
 Man (disambiguation)